The Missile Command is the coastal missile defence element of the Islamic Republic of Iran Navy (IRIN). In addition to this military formation, the Navy as well as the Aerospace Force of the Islamic Revolutionary Guard Corps –which independent of IRIN conduct their operations under another command hierarchy– have an arsenal of anti-ship missiles for coastal defence. The forces have collectively changed the balance of naval power in the Persian Gulf region since the mid-2000s decade, due to their capability to target almost all assets of the United States Navy's Fifth Fleet from Iranian coastline.

Missiles 
The unit is known to operate the following anti-ship missile (AShM) systems:
 Kowsar
 Nasr-1
 Noor
 Ghader
 Ghadir
 Ra'ad
 Abu Mahdi

References 

Islamic Republic of Iran Navy